Media panic is emotional criticism against a new medium or media technology such as the Internet, the World Wide Web, computer games or social media. Media panic  has a long history. At the end of the 18th century, print media were the subject of strong criticism in Great Britain for "the poison continually flowing thro' the channel of vulgar and licentious publications".

The Danish media scholar Kirsten Drotner defines media panic in the following way:
In some cases, debate of a new medium brings about - indeed changes into - heated, emotional reactions: in that case we have to do with what may be defined as a media panic. It may be considered a specification of the wider concept of moral panic, and it has some basic characteristics: the media is both instigator and purveyor of the discussion; the discussion is highly emotionally charged and morally polarised (the medium is either "good" or "bad") with the negative pole being the most visible in most cases; the discussion is an adult discussion that primarily focuses on children and young; the proponents often have professional stakes in the subject under discussion as teachers, librarians, cultural critics or academic scholars; the discussion, like a classic narrative, has three phases: a beginning often catapulted by a single case, a peak involving some kind of public or professional intervention, and an end (or fading-out phase) denoting a seeming resolution to the perceived problems in question.

Media panic may be considered a form of moral panic applied to new media.

See also
 Alarmism
 Sensationalism

References 

Crowd psychology
Mass media issues
Media bias
Media manipulation